The Hamilton and Alexandra College is an independent, private non-profit, co-educational day and boarding school located in Hamilton, Victoria, Australia.

History
The college came into existence as a co-educational school in 1962 as an amalgamation of the former Hamilton and Western District Boys' College which was founded in 1871, and Alexandra College, founded in 1872.

The school has been known as Hamilton College for most of its post amalgamation existence.  In the early 21st century, the name of the college was changed to The Hamilton And Alexandra College to reflect its relationship with Alexandra College, the former school for girls.

At the end of the third term, the current principal, Dr Andrew Hirst stepped down. The principle role has been filled by Vice-Principle Kristen Waldron until someone can be found.

Curricula
At Year 11 and 12 level, the school teaches the Victorian Certificate of Education (VCE).

Extracurricular activities
The school offers a range of extracurricular activities including outdoor education, choirs, jazz bands, a string ensemble and a concert band, drama and debating.

Sports offered include rowing and equestrian.

Campuses
The College has two campuses within Hamilton. The Chaucer Street Campus encompasses the Senior School accommodating students from Year 7 through to Year 12. A separate 14 hectare property, "Myrniong", contains boarding houses for both boys and girls, Junior Campus and Equestrian Centre and is situated one and a half kilometres from the Senior Campus.

Approximately 20-25% of students at the school are resident at the boarding houses.

Alumni
Phyllis Rountree who was born in 1911 attended this (Ladies) college before she became a noted bacteriologist.
Holly Williams Investigative journalist, foreign and war correspondent.
 Frank xu tenis

Urban Myths 
The College is reported to have a resident ghost who presents herself in the forms of odd sounds and occurrences, such as opening doors and faces in windows. She is referred to colloquially as "The Ghost of Mary Esther", and is said to have been a teacher who had an affair with a principal in the early 1900s. According to the tale, she fell pregnant with his child, after which he left her and she hanged herself from the clock-tower in despair, still haunting the campus in anger. Indeed the school's rowing club has a boat named in her honor.

There are also rumors of a tunnel running between the secondary campus and the old "Alexandra College" campus (now the pub, Alexandra House). Though no evidence has been found, it is said that they were dug during the Second World War, after the bombing of Darwin, as a shelter for the students.

References

External links
Hamilton and Alexandra College Website

Boarding schools in Victoria (Australia)
Educational institutions established in 1871
Secondary schools in Victoria (Australia)
Uniting Church schools in Australia
1871 establishments in Australia